The Bullshitters: Roll Out the Gunbarrel is a spoof of the TV series The Professionals. It was first broadcast in 1984 on Channel 4. Although it was made by many people behind The Comic Strip, it did not feature the Comic Strip title sequence, and is not considered by some to be part of the series. However, it was included in the Comic Strip DVD box set (2005), and its lead characters, Bonehead and Foyle reappeared in a later short Comic Strip film, Detectives on the Edge of a Nervous Breakdown. It was also represented as an episode of the show on 30 Years of The Comic Strip.

Synopsis

When Commander Jackson (Robbie Coltrane), head of DI5, hears that his daughter Janie has been kidnapped and held for ransom, he has to call in ex-agents Bonehead (Keith Allen) and Foyle (Peter Richardson) to save her. Since being kicked out of DI5, Bonehead works at a TV Tough Guys School, teaching others the "rules" of being a TV tough guy (such as not locking your car because you need to get straight back into it), and Foyle is now an actor on stage. Jackson blackmails the two into working together. It's time for Bonehead and Foyle – the flashiest, fastest and most under-dressed detectives to be kicked out of DI5 to get back to work. With a Magnum in one hand and a bus pass in the other, the Bullshitters set out to track down the criminals and get some good close-ups.

Cast

Keith Allen as Bonehead
Peter Richardson as Martin Foyle
Robbie Coltrane as Commander George Jackson
Alana Pellay as Herself 
Jimmy Fagg as Himself 
Fiona Hendley as Janie Jackson
Al Matthews as Admiral
George Khan as Thompson
Kevin Allen as KNOBS Student Chuck 
Gary Martin as KNOBS Student Stig
John Sarbutt as KNOBS Student Dean
David Farrington as KNOBS Student David Farrington
Anthony Sharp as West End Play Father 
Michael White as Himself 
Elvis Costello as Stone Deaf A&R Man

Gay themes
Bonehead and Foyle spend the latter half of the episode bare chested or with their shirts undone revealing their chests – in fact, as soon as they start working together again. During a chase scene, both of them are wearing undone jackets, briefs, and shoes – and nothing else. They put on jeans later on and then discard the jackets as they try to save Jackson's daughter.

Near the end of the episode, they hear a gunshot and hug each other in fright, before they declare their love for each other and kiss passionately. It turns out they have loved each other secretly for years.

External links

Channel 4 comedy
The Comic Strip Presents... episodes
1984 British television episodes
1984 television films
1984 films

1984 short films
Films directed by Stephen Frears